Interjectio is a genus of snout moths described by Carl Heinrich in 1956.

Species
Interjectio columbiella (McDunnough, 1935)
Interjectio denticulella (Ragonot, 1887)
Interjectio niviella (Hulst, 1888)

References

Phycitinae
Pyralidae genera
Taxa named by Carl Heinrich